Jorra is a township in Tsona County (Cona County) in the southeast of the Tibet Autonomous Region.

See also
List of township-level divisions of the Tibet Autonomous Region

References

Populated places in Shannan, Tibet